Giorgio Costantino Schinas (1834–1894) was a Maltese architect and civil engineer. He was of Greek descent.

He was born in Valletta in 1834 to Costantino Schinas and his wife Elisabetta Camilleri. He studied at the Royal University of Pavia, the Reale Scuola d'Applicazione degli Ingegneri of Turin, and the University of Malta, graduating as a civil engineer in 1863. He worked in the civil service, and he was the Superintendent for Public Works from 1888 until his death. He was granted the warrant of architect and land surveyor.

His most notable works are the Parish Church of St. Cajetan (1869–75) in Ħamrun and a water pumping station at Luqa. In the former, he used a combination of a number of architectural styles, including Gothic Revival and Baroque. He also planned a Romanesque Revival turret-like structure instead of a dome, but this was not built.

Schinas was also a professor of Mathematics and Physics at the University of Malta, and an ex-officio member of the Council of Government. He married Marianna Cassar Torreggani. Schinas died on 27 June 1894.

References

1834 births
1894 deaths
People from Valletta
Maltese people of Greek descent
19th-century Maltese architects
Maltese civil engineers
Maltese civil servants
University of Malta alumni
Academic staff of the University of Malta
Architects of Roman Catholic churches